The Masterplan is a compilation album by English rock band Oasis. It was released on 2 November 1998 by Creation Records, the band's final release through the label. It comprises B-sides which never made it onto an album up to that point. Originally intended for release only in areas such as the United States and Japan, where the tracks were previously only available on expensive European-import singles, The Masterplan reached number 2 in the UK, where it initially went platinum, and number 51 in the United States. However, it did reach the Top 20 in various charts around the world, going on to sell 3 million copies. It has since been certified triple platinum in the UK. Four songs from the album appear on the 2006 compilation album Stop the Clocks.

Reception

The Masterplan received mixed reviews from music critics on release. Reviewing in Rolling Stone, Barney Hoskyns criticised the collection as containing unimaginative songs, save for "Half the World Away" and "Headshrinker". Similarly, Matt Diehl of Entertainment Weekly considered the compilation "struttingly inconsistent", further criticising the band's consistent use of Beatles influences. On the other hand, Robert Hilburn in the Los Angeles Times was more favourable, writing: "virtually all the tunes on The Masterplan are appealing enough to have deserved a spot on one of Oasis' regular albums, and the best rank with the group's finest moments." James Oldham in NME expressed similar sentiments, finding that many of the collection's B-sides were better than the A-sides they were supporting. He continues that the collection further showcases the group's influences, overall considering it the band's "third best album". Reviewing the compilation in 2000, Michael Sandlin of Pitchfork gave the album an unfavourable review. He found that while some tracks, naming "Fade Away" and "Headshrinker" were better than some of their studio album tracks, the collection overall contained outtakes that were overall forgettable, stating "some outtakes are initially scrapped for good reason". 

Retrospectively, The Masterplan has received positive reviews, with many considering it one of Oasis' finest. In 2008, Spin magazine's David Marchese praised The Masterplan as a "greatest hits" collection, featuring "swirling epics, pop-rock confections, [and] headbutt hard rockers". Writing for AllMusic, Stephen Thomas Erlewine gave immense praise to The Masterplan, stating: "Apart from the sludgy instrumental "The Swamp Song", there isn't a weak track here, and the brilliant moments are essential not only for Oasis fans, but any casual follower of Britpop or post-grunge rock & roll." On the eve of the collection's 20th anniversary in 2018, Ian King of Stereogum also praised The Masterplan. While he likewise found "The Swamp Song" the collection's weak point, he wrote that the collection features many of the band's best songs. As the band would feature personnel changes following its release, King considers the compilation "the last refuge of the band's dreaming, climbing past; Manchester, Britpop, and all". In 2017, Henry Yates of NME ranked The Masterplan as Oasis' third best album, writing, "by the time this compilation arrived in '98, it came laced with forehead-slapping frustration that Noel didn't hold [these tracks] for a great third album."

Track listing

Personnel
 Liam Gallagher – lead vocals (1, 2, 5, 7, 8, 9, 11, 12, 13), tambourine
 Noel Gallagher – lead guitar, acoustic guitar, backing vocals, lead vocals (1, 3, 4, 10, 14), bass (4, 6, 14) drums (10), strings and horn arrangements (4, 14)
 Paul "Bonehead" Arthurs – rhythm guitar, acoustic guitar, keyboards (2, 3, 8, 9, 10, 11, 14), accordion (11)
 Paul "Guigsy" McGuigan – bass
 Alan White – drums, percussion (2, 4, 6, 9, 12, 14)
 Tony McCarroll – drums (1, 5, 7, 8, 11, 13)

Additional personnel
 Mike Rowe – keyboards (4, 12)
 Paul Weller – harmonica, lead guitar (6)
Nick Ingman – strings and horn arrangements (4, 14)
Owen Morris - bass (10), production

Charts and certifications

Weekly charts

Certifications

References

External links

The Masterplan at YouTube (streamed copy where licensed)

Oasis (band) compilation albums
B-side compilation albums
1998 compilation albums
Creation Records compilation albums
Epic Records compilation albums
Albums produced by Owen Morris